OK Pan Aarhus is an orienteering club based in Aarhus, Denmark. The club was founded 23.october 1946.

To date it is the only club to win the Jukola or Tiomila relays that has not been based in Norway, Sweden or Finland. The club won the Venla relay in 2013 and 2014. It won also the women's relay in Tiomila in 2014 with Miri Thrane Ødum, Ita Klingenberg, Ida Bobach, Maja Alm and Signe Søes.  Other prominent club members are the world champions Emma Klingenberg, Tue Lassen and Søren Bobach.

Tiomila Results

References

Sport in Aarhus
Orienteering clubs in Denmark